Too High to Die is the eighth studio album by American rock band the Meat Puppets. The album was released on January 25, 1994, by London Records. It was produced by Butthole Surfers guitarist Paul Leary. The album's title is a parody of The Ramones' 1984 album Too Tough to Die.

A limited edition of Too High to Die included the 10" vinyl promo EP Raw Meat. The cover art on this limited edition features more color than the simply pink-toned normal cover.

The album was supported by a lengthy tour, which included spots opening for the likes of Blind Melon, Soul Asylum, and Stone Temple Pilots (and shortly before the album's release, Nirvana).

Reception and legacy

Too High to Die sold very well due to the success of its single "Backwater", which reached #2 and #11 on the Billboard Mainstream Rock Tracks and Modern Rock Tracks charts respectively. The album itself also reached #1 on the Heatseekers chart, making it one of the Meat Puppets' most successful and highest ranking albums to date. The album was certified gold by the RIAA on October 6, 1994.

The rarely-seen video for "We Don't Exist" was nominated for "Best Metal/Hard Rock Video" at the 1995 MTV Video Music Awards, but lost to White Zombie's "More Human than Human".

In May 2012, the title of a book about the Meat Puppets' history borrowed part of the album's title, Too High to Die: Meet the Meat Puppets.

In July 2014, Guitar World placed Too High to Die at number 44 in their "Superunknown: 50 Iconic Albums That Defined 1994" list.

In October 2014, the Alternative Nation website listed Too High to Die at number 9 in their "Top 10 Alternative Rock Albums Of 1994" list.

Track listing
All songs written by Curt Kirkwood, unless otherwise noted.

Personnel
Meat Puppets

Derrick Bostrom – drums, paintings
Cris Kirkwood – bass guitar, vocals, illustrations
Curt Kirkwood – guitar, vocals, paintings

Production

Greg Calbi – mastering
Dave Jerden – mixing
Paul Leary – producer, mixing
Meat Puppets – producer
Stuart Sullivan – engineer, mixing
Brad Vosburg – engineer
G.E. Teel - assistant engineer
Josh Kiser – assistant
Michael Halsband – photography

Charts
Album – Billboard (United States)

Singles – Billboard (United States)

References

1994 albums
Meat Puppets albums
Albums produced by Paul Leary
Grunge albums